Elizabethton Municipal Airport  is three miles east of Elizabethton, in Carter County, Tennessee. The National Plan of Integrated Airport Systems for 2011–2015 categorized it as a general aviation airport.

Facilities
The airport covers 96 acres (39 ha) at an elevation of 1555.8 feet (474 m). Its one runway, 06/24, is 5,010 by 70 feet (1,380 x 21 m).

In the year ending October 25, 2011 the airport had 29,000 aircraft operations, average 79 per day, all general aviation. 48 aircraft were then based at this airport: 85% single-engine, 10% multi-engine, 2% jet, and 2% helicopter.

Accidents and incidents

 On August 15, 2019, a Cessna Citation Latitude private jet carrying Dale Earnhardt Jr. and his family was involved in a bounced landing where the airplane initially touched down on runway 24 before bouncing twice.  On the third touchdown, the right main landing gear collapsed and the right wing contacted the runway.  The airplane departed the paved surface beyond the runway 24 departure end threshold, through an open area of grass, down an embankment, through a chain-link fence, and up an embankment, coming to rest on the edge of Tennessee Highway 91.  Pilots noted a go-around attempt failed when the aircraft failed to respond, so they decided to land the plane on the runway with less than 300 metres remaining in the runway.  The crew then immediately evacuated Earnhardt, his wife Amy, daughter Isla Rose, and dog Gus. Dale Earnhardt, Jr. was relieved of his duties by NBC Sports for the 2019 Bass Pro Shops NRA Night Race as a precaution.  No passengers were seriously injured.

References

External links
 
 
 

Airports in Tennessee
Buildings and structures in Carter County, Tennessee
Transportation in Carter County, Tennessee